Siano is a town and comune in the province of Salerno in the Campania region of south-western Italy.

Geography
The municipality has its borders with Bracigliano, Castel San Giorgio, Mercato San Severino, Quindici (AV) and Sarno.

References

External links

 Siano official website
 Website about Siano

Cities and towns in Campania